The Carapellotto is a river in the province of Foggia in the Apulia region of Italy. The source of the river is near Deliceto. The river flows northeast and then curves eastward before joining the Carapelle southwest of Ordona as a left tributary of the river.

References

Rivers of the Province of Foggia
Rivers of Italy
Adriatic Italian coast basins